. 
The Ingenues was a vaudeville all-female jazz band based in the American Midwest, which toured the United States and other countries from 1925 to 1937. Managed by Edward Gorman Sherman (1880-1940), the orchestra performed with great popularity in variety theater, vaudeville and picture houses, often billed as "The Twenty Paul Whitemans of Syncopation." They performed many songs in the Ziegfeld Follies of 1927, Glorifying the American Girl, including the first act finale, "Melody Land," featuring 12 pianos. Other Follies numbers featured violins, banjoes and saxophones from The Ingenues. The group performed popular songs, light classical works and novelties. They were celebrated for their versatility, as most members, including star soloist and "trick trombonist" Paula Jones, doubled on both novelty (accordions, harmonicas, banjos) and symphonic instruments. The group toured Europe, South Africa, Asia, Australia and Brazil (where they also recorded for Columbia Records). The band appeared in film shorts including The Band Beautiful and Syncopating Sweeties (Vitaphone 1928) and Maids and Music (RKO, 1937). Maids and Music was produced independently by Milton Schwarzwald's Nu-Atlas Productions and released as a 16mm home movie by Pictoreels.  Sequences from this and other Schwarzwald short subjects were also re-edited into Soundies; in the case of Maids and Music the Soundies excerpt was titled "Ray Fabing's Versatile Ingenues".

Further reading 
Dahl, Linda. Stormy Weather: The Music and Lives of a Century of Jazz Women (New York: Limelight 1984)

McGee, Kristin. "The Feminization of Mass Culture and the Novelty of All-Girl Bands: The Case of the Ingenues" in Popular Music and Society 31/5, 2008: pp. 629–662

McGee, Kristin. Some Liked it Hot: Jazz Women in Film and Television, 1928-1959 (Middletown, CT: Wesleyan University Press 2009): pp. 34–66

Dreyfus, Kay. Sweethearts of Rhythm: The Story of Australia's All-Girl Bands and Orchestras to the End of the Second World War (Currency Press 1999)

External links

Brown Family Papers at the Newberry Library

American jazz ensembles from Illinois
Vaudeville performers
All-female bands
Musical groups established in 1925
1925 establishments in Illinois
Musical groups disestablished in 1937
1937 disestablishments in the United States